Ghatu dance is a Nepalese folk dance of the Gurung community of western Nepal. The dance is performed mainly during Baisakh Purnima (full moon day of the Hindu month Baisakh) festival. The dance is started on the previous new moon day of the same month. The dancers are selected on the day of Shree Panchami and then trained for three/four months. Alongside Gurung community, the dance is also performed by people of Magar, Dura, Balami and Kumal communities.

Performance 
In Ghatu dance performance, the story of king Pashramu and queen Yambawati (or Champawati) is presented. Among the two main Ghatu dancers (known as Ghatusari), one plays the role of the king and other plays the role of the queen. King Pashramu goes on a hunt where he meets Yambawati. They marry each other. They have a child. King Pashramu goes on a war, where he dies. The queen then decides to go on a Sati and immolate herself on her husband's pyre. The dancers goes in a trance state during the dance.

There are two type of Ghatu dances:

 Bahramase Ghatu
 Sati Ghatu

Bahramase Ghatu could be performed through out the year and the daily activities of people such as farming and domestic work are presented in this Ghatu. Sati can only be performed from Shree Panchami (December/January) to Baisakh Purnima (April/ May.) In Sati Ghatu, the main story of the king and queen is presented and during the dance, the dancers goes in a trance like state (known to be as being possessed by Kusunda). The dancers then dance in meticulously slow steps.

The Ghatu song is usually sung by the men, which is accompanied by the Madal drum. The song is passed orally from generation to generation. Alongside the story of Pashramu and Yambawati, different daily domestic and agricultural practice are also presented. The performance is divided into multiple parts known as Dandi.

On the night before the dance, the villagers have a feast (known as dar). On the day of the dance, the priest and dancers only eat fruits. After performing special puja, the dance is begun.

The dance is concluded on the day of Baisakh Purnima. The dance is concluded on some specific temples and river basins with official rituals by the priest. After the dance is concluded with official rituals, the performance of the dance is restricted until Shree Panchami. Although Bahramase Ghatu could be performed through out the year, it is also generally avoided until the day of Shree Panchami.

Origin 
Since the tradition is handed over orally, the exact origin of the dance is unknown. There are many anomalies between the dance practice and the general practice of Gurung people. Gurung people follow Buddhist and Bon practices, while the dance is related to Hindu customs. Many aspects of the dance including Sati are alien to Gurung culture. The language of the song is also not in Gurung or any related language but in some Indo-Aryan language close to old Nepali language with influence of Awadhi language. It is also speculated that the queen Yambawati may be a woman from the southern plains who brought the song with her. King Pashramu and queen Yambawati are also considered to be the sixteenth century king and queen of the Lamjung kingdom of Nepal.

Costume and props 
The dancers are dressed in Gurung cultural dress and jewelries. A crown made of flowers and roasted paddy is also worn by the dancers. Various props such as horse for the king, comb for the queen. bow and arrow are made each year by the people, which are used during the dance.

Selection of the dancers 
The dancers of Ghatu dance are known as Ghatusari. Traditionally, Ghatusari are selected on the day of Shree Panchami after a special puja. Prepubescent girls without any scar in their bodies and whose hair has not been trimmed since birth are selected as Ghatusari. The girls are then made to sing Ghatu songs and among them, two of the girls who are possessed by the Ghatu are chosen for the dance.

See also 

 Maruni
 Deuda
 Jhijhiya

References 

Nepalese folk dances
Gurung culture
Dance in Nepal
Culture of Gandaki
Magar culture